Hamraz is a Pakistani suspense thriller mystery film directed by Khwaja Khurshid Anwar. It started Shamim Ara and Mohammed Ali. Agha Talish, Lehri, Tariq Aziz and Meena Shorey appeared in supporting roles. It was released on 20 October 1967. The film is one of the Anwar's signature films for which he wrote the screenplay and composed the music also. The plot revolves around two sisters, and the conspiracy against them to grab their property.

Plot

Cast 
 Shamim Ara as Shehzadi/ Gul Bano
 Mohammed Ali as Dr. Javed
 Agha Talish as Nawab Ahsan Mirza
 Lehri as Altaf
 Tariq Aziz as Dr. Afandi
 Nabeela as Fakhra
 Rangeela as Nawabzada Sultan Mirza
 Meena Shorey as Husan Ara Begum
 Ajmal as Rehman Baba

Soundtrack 
The music director of the film was Khwaja Khurshid Anwar, and the lyrics were written by Qateel Shifai.

Track list

References

Notelist

External links 

1960s Urdu-language films
Pakistani thriller films
Pakistani black-and-white films
Urdu-language Pakistani films